Oryza rufipogon, known as brownbeard rice, wild rice, and red rice, is a member of the genus Oryza.

It is native to East, Southeast and South Asia. It has a close evolutionary relation to Oryza sativa, the plant grown as a major rice food crop throughout the world. Both have an AA genome.

Oryza glumaepatula is a related species according to molecular biology approaches. It used to be considered a synonym referring to the South American race of O. rufipogon.

Invasive species
Oryza rufipogon is an invasive species and listed as a 'noxious weed' by the United States, and also listed as a noxious weed in  Alabama, California, Florida, Massachusetts, Minnesota, North Carolina, Oregon, South Carolina, and Vermont. According to the NAPPO (North American Plant Protection Organization), O. rufipogon blends in with cultivated O. sativa so well that it cannot be detected. In this position it competes with the cultivated rice and uses valuable fertilizer and space. O. rufipogon sheds most of its seeds before the harvest, therefore contributing little to the overall yield. In addition, the rice grains produced by the plant are not eaten by consumers, who see it as a strange foreign particle in otherwise white rice.

Genetics

Selection
As with a great many plants and animals, O. rufipogon has a positive correlation between effective population size and magnitude of selection pressure. O. r. having an EPS of ~140,000, it clusters with others of about the same EPS, and has 78% of its amino acid sites under selection.

Precious germplasm

A paper on conservation genetics of wild rice in the journal Molecular Ecology has this to say about O. rufipogon: "This is the most agriculturally important but seriously endangered wild rice species."

In India, the Pallikaranai marshland contains the wild rice Oryza rufipogon, described by the Sálim Ali Centre for Ornithology and Natural History (SACON) as a "precious germplasm."

See also

Wild rice

References

rufipogon
Flora of China
Flora of tropical Asia
Flora of Australia